Fusine is a comune (municipality) in the Province of Sondrio in the Italian region Lombardy, located about  northeast of Milan and about  southwest of Sondrio. Its territory was historically part of Carniola.

Fusine borders the following municipalities: Berbenno di Valtellina, Cedrasco, Colorina, Foppolo, Forcola, Postalesio, Tartano.

Demographic evolution

References

External links
 Website
 Fusine - The town of Fusine

Cities and towns in Lombardy